Six-Gun Serenade is a 1947 American Western film directed by Ford Beebe and written by Bennett Cohen. The film stars Jimmy Wakely, Lee "Lasses" White, Kay Morley, Jimmy Martin, Steve Clark and Pierce Lyden. The film was released on April 15, 1947, by Monogram Pictures.

Plot

Cast          
Jimmy Wakely as Jimmy Wakely
Lee "Lasses" White as 'Lasses' White
Kay Morley as Mary Saunders
Jimmy Martin as Curt Weldon 
Steve Clark as Martin Kaly
Pierce Lyden as Buck
Bud Osborne as Sheriff
Rivers Lewis as Lon
Arthur 'Fiddlin' Smith as Bill
Stanley Ellison as Joe

References

External links
 

1947 films
American Western (genre) films
1947 Western (genre) films
Monogram Pictures films
Films directed by Ford Beebe
American black-and-white films
1940s English-language films
1940s American films